Spiders is a Swedish rock band from Gothenburg featuring Ann-Sofie Hoyles, John Hoyles, Olle Griphammar and Ricard Harryson. The band has released three albums, Flash Point in October 2012, Shake Electric in 2014 and Killer Machine in 2018.

Discography

Albums

References

External links

Official website
Facebook

Swedish musical groups